is located in Funabashi, Chiba, Japan.

Notable races 

Horse racing venues in Japan
Sports venues in Chiba Prefecture
Funabashi
Sports venues completed in 1950
1950 establishments in Japan